The Railroad Man is a 1956 Italian drama film directed by Pietro Germi.

Plot
Train operator Andrea Marcocci witnesses the suicide of a desperate man who jumps in front of his train. Under the influence of this shock, he starts making mistakes. A check-up by a doctor reveals that he's at the brink of becoming an alcoholic. Due to this evaluation, he is demoted and must accept a salary cut.

Cast
 Pietro Germi - Andrea Marcocci
 Luisa Della Noce - Sara Marcocci
 Sylva Koscina - Giulia Marcocci (as Silva)
 Saro Urzì - Gigi Liverani
 Carlo Giuffrè - Renato Borghi
 Renato Speziali - Marcello Marcocci
 Edoardo Nevola - Sandro Marcocci (as il piccolo Edoardo Nevola)

Awards
1956 Cannes Film Festival : OCIC Award - Special Mention 
Nastro d'Argento : Best Director, Best Producer.
San Sebastian Film Festival : Best Film, Best Director, Best Actress (Luisa Della Noce)

References

External links

1956 films
1956 drama films
Italian drama films
1950s Italian-language films
Italian black-and-white films
Films set in Italy
Films set in Rome
Films directed by Pietro Germi
Films produced by Carlo Ponti
Films scored by Carlo Rustichelli
Films with screenplays by Luciano Vincenzoni
1950s Italian films